Iconsiam, stylized as ICONSIAM, and ICS is a mixed-use development on the banks of the Chao Phraya River in Bangkok, Thailand. It includes one of the largest shopping malls in Asia, which opened to the public on 9 November 2018, as well as hotels and residences. The ฿54 billion (US$1.5 billion) project was jointly developed by Siam Piwat group, a Thai luxury retail developer, MQDC Magnolia Quality Development, and Charoen Pokphand Group. The complex includes the 5th tallest buildings in Thailand: the 52-story Mandarin Oriental Residences and the 70-floor Magnolias Waterfront Residences.

Features 

ICONSIAM Building
  of total retail floor space.
 The first Siam Takashimaya department store and the first Apple Store in Thailand.
 A 3,000-seat auditorium/exhibition hall
 Iconsiam Heritage Museum (River Museum Bangkok), a joint venture with The Fine Arts Department of the Ministry of Culture of Thailand.
 Two residential buildings, the Magnolia Waterfront Residences (318m and 70 floors, 300 units) and The Residences at Mandarin Oriental, Bangkok, (272m, 52 floors, 146 units).
 A riverside park with an area of more than  along the Chao Phraya River and a riverside walkway.

ICS Building
 An expansion to the current mall with additional shops and restaurants.
 A 244-room Hilton Garden Inn Bangkok ICS by Hilton Hotels & Resorts.

Transport 
ICONSIAM is located adjacent to the APM Gold Line Charoen Nakhon Station, which connects to the BTS system at Krung Thon Buri Station. It opened on 16 December 2020.
ICONSIAM is working with the Urban Design and Development Centre (UDDC) at Chulalongkorn University, the Marine Department of the Transport Ministry, and the Bangkok Metropolitan Administration to upgrade four river piers—Sathorn, Ratchawong, Tha Dindaeng, and Ratcha Nevy—by June 2019. Four piers are built on site for private boats and public ferries. Visitors can ride the ferry provided by ICONSIAM from various piers; Sathorn Pier, Sheraton Hotel Bangkok, Si Phraya Pier.

Awards 
The project won several design accolades since its opening, including:

 Best Design of the Year at the World Retail Awards 2019 hosted by the World Retail Congress;
 First prize in the Best Shopping Center category at the MAPIC Awards 2019 in Cannes;
 2020 VIVA Best-of-the-Best Design and Development Award; and
 One of the top four finalist in the MPIM International Real Estate Awards 2021 in the Best Shopping Centre category.

Gallery

See also 
 List of tallest buildings in Bangkok
 List of tallest buildings in Thailand

References 

Shopping malls in Bangkok
Buildings and structures on the Chao Phraya River
Shopping malls established in 2018
Ratchathewi district